In geology, a terrane (in full, a tectonostratigraphic terrane) is a crust fragment formed on a tectonic plate (or broken off from it) and accreted or "sutured" to crust lying on another plate.  The crustal block or fragment preserves its own distinctive geologic history, which is different from that of the surrounding areas—hence the term "exotic" terrane. The suture zone between a terrane and the crust it attaches to is usually identifiable as a fault. A sedimentary deposit that buries the contact of the terrane with adjacent rock is called an overlap formation. An igneous intrusion that has intruded and obscured the contact of a terrane with adjacent rock is called a stitching pluton.

Older usage of terrane simply described a series of related rock formations or an area having a preponderance of a particular rock or rock groups.

Overview
A tectonostratigraphic terrane is not necessarily an independent microplate in origin, since it may not contain the full thickness of the lithosphere. It is a piece of crust which has been transported laterally, usually as part of a larger plate, and is relatively buoyant due to thickness or low density.  When the plate of which it was a part subducted under another plate, the terrane failed to subduct, detached from its transporting plate, and accreted onto the overriding plate.  Therefore, the terrane transferred from one plate to the other. Typically, accreting terranes are portions of continental crust which have rifted off another continental mass and been transported surrounded by oceanic crust, or they are old island arcs formed at some distant subduction zones.

A tectonostratigraphic terrane is a fault-bounded package of rocks of at least regional extent characterized by a geologic history which differs from that of neighboring terranes.  The basic characteristics of these terranes is that the present spatial relations are not compatible with the inferred geologic histories.  Where terranes which lie next to each other possess strata of the same age, it must be demonstrable that the geologic evolutions are different and incompatible, and there must be an absence of intermediate lithofacies which could link the strata.

The concept of tectonostratigraphic terrane  developed from studies in the 1970s of the complicated Pacific Cordilleran orogenic margin of North America, a complex and diverse geological potpourri that was difficult to explain until the new science of plate tectonics illuminated the ability of crustal fragments to "drift" thousands of miles from their origin and fetch up, crumpled, against an exotic shore. Such terranes were dubbed "accreted terranes" by geologists.

When terranes are composed of repeated accretionary events, and hence are composed of subunits with distinct history and structure, they may be called superterranes.

Tectonostratigraphic terranes

Africa

Birminian Terrane
Kahiltna Terrane
Likasi Terrane
Mozambique Belt

Asia

Aldan Terrane
Birekte Terrane
Bargusin Terrane
Daldyn Terrane
Magan Terrane
Markha Terrane
Midyan Terrane
Shan–Thai Terrane
Tungus Terrane
Tynda Terrane
Uchur Terrane

Taiwan

Coastal Range Terrane
Longitudinal Valley Terrane
Eastern Central Range Terrane
Western Central Range Terrane
Hsuehshan Range Terrane
Western Foothills Terrane
Coastal Plain Terrane

Tibet

Lhasa Terrane
Qiangtang Terrane
Xigaze Terrane
Bainang Terrane
Zedong Terrane
Dazhuqu Terrane

Australasia

Brook Street Terrane
Buller Terrane
Caples Terrane
East Tasmanian Terrane
Glenburgh Terrane
Dun Mountain-Maitai Terrane
Molong—Monaro Terrane
Murihiku Terrane
Narryer Gneiss Terrane
Takaka Terrane
Torlesse Composite Terrane
Waipapa Composite Terrane
West Tasmanian Terrane

Europe

Armorican terrane
Avalonia
Avalon Composite Terrane
Balearic Terrane
Briançonnais Terrane 
Central Highlands Terrane
Central Southern Uplands Terrane
Charnwood Terrane
Hebridean Terrane
Leinster—Lakesman Terrane
Midland Valley Terrane
North Armorican Composite Terrane 
Northern Highlands Terrane
Rosslare—Monian Terranes
Southern North Sea Terrane
Tregor—La Hague Terrane
Wrekin Terrane

Fennoscandia

Bamble Terrane 
Idefjorden Terrane 
Kongsberg Terrane
Telemarkia Terrane
Western Gneiss Region

North America

Avalonia Terrane
Bancroft Terrane
Buffalo Head Terrane
Cache Creek Terrane
Carolina Terrane
Cassiar Terrane
Crescent Terrane
Elzevir Terrane
Frontenac Terrane
Franciscan Complex
Ganderia Terrane
Hottah Terrane
Insular Superterrane
Intermontane Plate and Intermontane Belt
Meguma Terrane
Occidentalia Terrane
Pacific Rim Terrane
Pearya Terrane
Quesnellia
Salinian Block
Slide Mountain Terrane
Smartville Block
Sonomia Terrane
Steel Mountain Terrane
Stikinia
Wrangellia Terrane
Yakutat Block
Yukon—Tanana Terrane

South America

Arequipa-Antofalla
Chaitenia
Chilenia
Chiloé Block
Cuchilla Dionisio Terrane
Cuyania
Fitz Roy Terrane
Madre de Dios Terrane
Mejillonía
Nico Pérez Terrane
Pampia
Paranapanema block
Piedra Alta Terrane
Tandilia Terrane

References

Citations

General bibliography 
 McPhee, John (1981). Basin and Range. New York: Farrar, Straus and Giroux.
 McPhee, John (1983). In Suspect Terrain. New York: Farrar, Straus and Giroux.
 McPhee, John (1993). Assembling California. New York: Farrar, Straus and Giroux.

External links

 West Antarctica terrane analysis 
 Examples of accreted terrane in Idaho
 Alaskan Terranes